Ronald Kerry Rowe, OC, BSc, BE, PhD, D.Eng, DSc (hc), FRS, FREng, NAE, FRSC, FCAE, Dist.M.ASCE, FEIC, FIE(Aust), FCSCE, PEng., CPEng. (born 13 September 1951) is a Canadian civil engineer of Australian birth, one of the pioneers of geosynthetics.

Education
Rowe was educated at Fort Street High School, Sydney (1964-1969) and the University of Sydney, where he was awarded a BSc (Computer Science) in 1973, BE (First Hons, Civil Engineering) and the University Medal in 1975, a PhD in 1979 and D.Eng in 1993.

Career and research
Rowe worked as a geotechnical engineer with the Australian Government Department of Construction prior to emigrating to Canada in 1978, where he spent 22 years as a professor, including 8 years as Chair of the Department of Civil and Environmental Engineering at The University of Western Ontario, London, Canada.

From 2000 to 2010 he served as Vice-Principal (Research) at Queen's University in Kingston, Ontario where he was responsible for the administration of all research (in Business, Education, Humanities, Law, Social Sciences, Physical and Biological Sciences, Engineering and Applied Sciences, Health Sciences and Medicine). He is presently (2023) a Professor and the Canada Research Chair in Geotechnical and Geoenvironmental Engineering in the Department of Civil Engineering at Queen's.

His research has covered contaminant migration through soil and rock, landfill design, containment of contaminated sites, geosynthetics (including geotextiles, geomembranes, geogrids, geonets etc.), tailings storage facilities and dams, reinforced embankments and walls, tunnels in soft ground and the failure of slopes and excavations. In particular he has researched the effectiveness of plastic (geomembrane) liners and geosynthetic clay liners (a composite material incorporating clay) that limit contamination from mining operations and waste disposal facilities.

He is a past President of the International Geosynthetics Society, the Canadian Geotechnical Society and the Engineering Institute of Canada.

Publications
 Google Scholar - Kerry Rowe

Honours and awards
 2001: Fellow of the Royal Society of Canada
 2004: Killam Prize, awarded by the Canada Council
 2005: Rankine Lecture to the British Geotechnical Association
 2010: International Fellow, UK Royal Academy of Engineering
 2012: Sir John Kennedy Medal of the Engineering Institute of Canada
 2013: Fellow of the Royal Society of London, UK
 2014: Thomas Telford Gold Medal of the Institution of Civil Engineers
 2015: Miroslaw Romanowski Medal of the Royal Society of Canada
 2016: Member of the National Academy of Engineering 
 2018: Officer of the Order of Canada
 2018: International Geosynthetics Society Award and Gold Medal
 2020: Elected Distinguished Member American Society of Civil Engineers
 2022: Inaugural winner of the NSERC Donna Strickland Prize for Societal Impact of Natural Sciences and Engineering Research

References

1951 births
Engineers from Sydney
Canadian civil engineers
Canadian Fellows of the Royal Society
Fellows of the Royal Society of Canada
Living people
Officers of the Order of Canada